Kyle Stewart (born 10 March 1997) is a New Zealand rugby union player, currently playing for the Old Glory DC of Major League Rugby (MLR) and  in the National Provincial Championship. His preferred position is prop.

Professional career
Stewart signed for Major League Rugby side Old Glory DC for the 2022 Major League Rugby season.

References

External links
itsrugby.co.uk Profile

1997 births
Living people
Rugby union props
New Zealand rugby union players
Taranaki rugby union players
Rugby Lyons Piacenza players
Manawatu rugby union players
Old Glory DC players